State Road 583 (SR 583) is a , north–south highway that travels from Tampa to Temple Terrace in Hillsborough County, Florida.

Route description
The roadway then continues north passing over SR 574 before intersecting US 92 which provides easy access to US 301 which does not intersect SR 583. SR 583 then continues northward to Temple Terrace, Florida where it intersects the eastern terminus of State Road 580 and then terminates at SR 582 where the roadway continues north as 56th Street and County Road 583 (CR 583) to intersect CR 582A. SR 583 is also goes under the name of 56th Street for almost its entire duration.

Major intersections

References

External links

583
583
State Roads in Tampa, Florida